Jovetić is a surname. Notable people with the surname include:

Dijana Jovetić (born 1984), Croatian handball player
Stevan Jovetić (born 1989), Montenegrin footballer

Serbian surnames